The John Boyum House, at 225 W. Sixth St. in Hardin, Montana, was built in 1917.  It was listed on the National Register of Historic Places in 1991.  The listing included two contributing buildings.

It is an American craftsman bungalow in style, and was probably built by local contractor Wilbur S. Fish.

References

American Craftsman architecture in Montana
National Register of Historic Places in Big Horn County, Montana
Houses completed in 1917
Houses in Big Horn County, Montana